Grilo is a Portuguese surname. Notable people with the surname include:

Hugo Grilo (born 1986), Portuguese footballer
João Mário Grilo (born 1958), Portuguese film director, author and professor
Luís Grilo (born 1946), Portuguese wrestler
Marco Grilo (born 1993), Portuguese footballer 
Paulo Grilo (born 1991), Portuguese footballer
Rubén Grilo (born 1981), Spanish contemporary artist
Sarah Grilo (born circa 1919), Argentine painter
Sérgio Grilo (born 1983), Portuguese football player and coach 

Portuguese-language surnames